Radville Airport  is located  east of Radville, Saskatchewan, Canada.

See also 
 List of airports in Saskatchewan

References

External links 
Page about this airport on COPA's Places to Fly airport directory

Registered aerodromes in Saskatchewan
Laurier No. 38, Saskatchewan